Arcangelo Sassolino (born 1967) is an Italian artist known for his sculptures that uses technology.

Early life 
Sassolino was born in 1967 in Vicenza, Italy. He was raised in Trissino, near Vicenza, in the north-east of Italy. In his 20s, he created a three-dimensional puzzle game recalling the Rubik's Cube, and was hired by Robert Fuhrer and Nextoy, LLC, representatives of Casio Creative Products, for which worked for 6 years in New York, inventing and developing original and innovative toys and games. In 1996 Sassolino went back to Italy, where he worked on marble sculpture in Pietrasanta.

Artistic Path 
In Sassolino's works the spectators find themselves in front of well known industrial materials, such as stainless steel, glass or concrete. He uses these materials into mechanical/thermodynamical fantastic machines, that make the elements reach their limits: extreme speed, friction, gravity, heat, pressure.

Sassolino's sculptures are inorganic performances in which machines take life, get broken by contrast and conflict of forces, on the verge of a breakdown (which is a fundamental aspect of his work). He works around concepts such caducity, loss, unpredictability, danger, failure.

Solo exhibitions 
Superdome, Palais de Tokyo, Paris. 29/5/2008 – 24/8/2008
Time Tomb, Z33 House for Contemporary Art], Hasselt. 0/5/2010 – 29/8/2010
Piccolo animismo, Macro, Rome. 9/3/2011 – 12/6/2011
Not Human, Contemporary Art Museum St. Louis, 15/1/2016 – 3/4/2016
Mechanism of Power, Frankfurter Kunstverein, Frankfurt. 19/2/2016 – 17/4/2016
Canto V, Galleria Continua, San Gimignano. 21/9/ 2016 – 15/1/2017
Matter Revealed Repetto Gallery, London. 4/10/2017 – 29/10/2017

Group exhibitions 
Materia-Niente, Fondazione Bevilacqua La Masa, Venice. 26/4/2001 – 30/6/2001
Temi & variazioni 
La scultura italiana del XXI secolo, Fondazione Arnaldo Pomodoro], Milan. 29/10/2010 – 30/ 1/ 2011
Under Destruction, Museum Tinguely, Basel – 15/10/2010 – 23/1/2011; Swiss Institute, New York 6/4/2011 – 8/5/2011 
Art and the City Zürich-West. 9/6/2012 – 23/9/2012
Francis Bacon e la condizione esistenziale nell'arte contemporanea, CCC Strozzina, Florence – 5/10/2012 – 27/1/2013
Follia Continua ! 104 Le Centroquatre, Paris – 21/10/2015 – 21/11/2015
The Transported Man [Broad Art Museum], East Lansing. 29/4/2017 – 22/10/2017
Porto Marghera 100 Doge's Palace, Venice, 4/11/2017 – 28/1/2018

Bibliography 
 Gabriele Guercio e Anna Mattirolo (a cura di), Il confine evanescente. Arte italiana 1960–2010, 2010, Electa, pag.188–189 
 Francis Bacon e la condizione esistenziale nell’arte contemporanea, exhibit's catalogue by Franziska Nori and Barbara Dawson, Centro di Cultura Contemporanea Strozzina, Fondazione Palazzo Strozzi. October 5, 2012– January 27, 2013
 ART AND THE CITY, A public art project, catalogo della mostra. Zurigo 9 giugno-23 settembre 2012. Curator Christoph Doswald, JRP Ringier Verlag, Zurich.
 A.A.V.V., l’arte del XX secolo. Tendenze della contemporaneità 2000 e oltre, 2010, Skira, pag 270–271
 AAVV, Vitamin 3-D, New Perspectives in Sculpture and Installation. An up-to-the-minute survey of contemporary sculpture and installation featuring 117 artists, Phaidon Editors, 2009, pag 266–267
 Jasper Sharp (edited by), Arcangelo Sassolino, JRP Ringier, 2009. Under Destruction, If nothing can be created, then something must be destroyed, edited by Gianni Jetzer – Chris Sharp, catalogue of the exhibition, Tinguely Museum Basel, Swiss Institute New York, 2010, Published by Distanz.
 Luca Illetterati e Arcangelo Sassolino, 6 words 20 works, Padova University Press, Padova, 2016 
 Giulia Zandonadi, Il ritmo della materia. Forma e tempo nell'opera di Arcangelo Sassolino, tesi di laurea magistrale, Università Ca' Foscari Venezia, relatore Nico Stringa, correlatore Stefania Portinari, a.a. 2013/2014
 Giulia Plebani, Arcangelo Sassolino. Materiali ai limiti della resistenza, master's degree thesis, University of Bologna, supervisor Silvia Grandi.

Note 

1967 births
Living people
Italian male sculptors
Italian contemporary artists